Liptena yakadumae is a butterfly in the family Lycaenidae. It is found in south-eastern Cameroon.

References

Butterflies described in 1917
Liptena
Endemic fauna of Cameroon
Butterflies of Africa